Pineland Country Club near Mullins, South Carolina is one of South Carolina's oldest country clubs. The golf course was designed by Gene Hamm and it opened in 1971.

References

Golf clubs and courses in South Carolina
Buildings and structures in Marion County, South Carolina